M Atiqur Rahman (born 1 September 1931) was a Lieutenant General and Bangladesh's Chief of Army Staff from 1986 to 1990. He was commissioned from 9th PMA long course on 13 March 1954 in the corps of Artillery.

Career 
Rahman Served as Director general of Bangladesh Rifles (Now Bangladesh Border Guard) from 1977 to 1982.

References

Chiefs of Army Staff, Bangladesh
Living people
1931 births
Bangladesh Army generals
Director Generals of Border Guards Bangladesh